Meetei Mayek Extensions is a Unicode block containing characters for historic Meitei language orthographies.

History
The following Unicode-related documents record the purpose and process of defining specific characters in the Meetei Mayek Extensions block:

References 

Meitei script
Unicode blocks